Oscar W. Hagen (March 7, 1884 – September 12, 1945) was a North Dakota Republican Party politician who served as the 20th Lieutenant Governor of North Dakota from 1941 to 1943 under Governor John Moses. Hagen also served in the North Dakota House from 1937 to 1940.

Biography
Hagen was born in 1884 in Richland County, North Dakota.

References

1884 births
1945 deaths
Lieutenant Governors of North Dakota
20th-century American politicians
Speakers of the North Dakota House of Representatives
Republican Party members of the North Dakota House of Representatives